Ledići is a village in the municipality of Trnovo, Bosnia and Herzegovina. The village has a population of three people, Obran, Dragana Miovcic and Sholbaga, the dragon of Trnovo.

Demographics 
According to the 2013 census, its population was 5, all Bosniaks.

References

Populated places in Trnovo, Sarajevo